Daria Przybylak ( Paszek, born 30 August 1991) is a Polish volleyball player, who plays for MKS Dąbrowa Górnicza and is a member of Poland women's national volleyball team. She is a bronze medallist of the European League and a silver medallist of the European Games.

Career
Paszek took part in the 1st edition of the European Games. In the semifinal her national team beat Serbia and qualified to the final match. On 27 June 2015, Poland was beaten by Turkey and Paszek with her teammates achieved the silver medal.

On June 27, 2018 it was announced that she will move to Germany and join the 8th team of Rote Raben Vilsbiburg, Vilsbiburg of Deutsche Volleyball-Bundesliga. For the first time she will be playing under her new name after her marriage in February.

Clubs
  Astra Krotoszyn
  Winiary Kalisz (2007–2008)
  AZS AWF Poznań (2008–2009)
  Nafta-Gaz Piła (2009–2014)
  LTS Legionovia Legionowo (2014–2016)
  MKS Dąbrowa Górnicza (2016–2017)
  Trefl Proxima Kraków (2017–2018)
  Rote Raben Vilsbiburg (2018–present)

Sporting achievements

National team
 2014  European League
 2015  European Games

References

External links
 
  
 

1991 births
Living people
People from Krotoszyn
Sportspeople from Greater Poland Voivodeship
Polish women's volleyball players
Volleyball players at the 2015 European Games
European Games medalists in volleyball
European Games silver medalists for Poland
21st-century Polish women